Tár is a 2022 psychological drama film written and directed by Todd Field and starring Cate Blanchett. The film charts the downfall of fictional composer and conductor Lydia Tár. The supporting cast includes Nina Hoss, Noémie Merlant, Sophie Kauer, Julian Glover, Allan Corduner, and Mark Strong. Tár premiered at the 79th Venice International Film Festival in September 2022, where Blanchett won the Volpi Cup for Best Actress. The film had a limited theatrical release in the United States on October 7, 2022, before a wide release on October 28, by Focus Features.

Tár was selected Best Film of the Year by the New York Film Critics Circle, the Los Angeles Film Critics Association, and the National Society of Film Critics, becoming only the seventh film in history named as such from the nation's top critics' groups, the so-called "trifecta".

Tár was named "Best Picture of the Year" by more critics than any other film released in 2022. From among others, Vanity Fair, The Guardian, Daily Variety, The Hollywood Reporter, Screen Daily, Entertainment Weekly, The Atlantic, and IndieWires annual poll of 136 critics worldwide. The American Film Institute named it one of the top 10 films of the year.

At the 80th Golden Globe Awards, Blanchett won Best Actress in a Motion Picture – Drama, while the film was nominated for Best Motion Picture – Drama and Best Screenplay. At the 28th Critics Choice Awards, Blanchett won Best Actress, and Guðnadóttir won Best Score. For the 76th British Academy Film Awards, the film received five nominations.

At the 95th Academy Awards, Tár received six nominations including Best Picture, Best Director and Best Original Screenplay for Field, and Best Actress for Blanchett, but failed to win any of them.

Accolades

Notes

References

External links 
 

Tár